The Portrait of Elena Anguissola (alternative name: Portrait of the artist’s sister Elena in the guise of a nun), dated to 1551, is one of the earliest paintings by Sofonisba Anguissola. It hangs in the Southampton City Art Gallery.

Description 
This portrait shows the nun Elena Anguissola, a novice with the name of Sister Minerva. The painting is signed and dated but difficult to read: : SOPHONISBA ANGUSSOLA VIRGO M [...] TERI AGO.TI PINXIT MDLI. Flavio Caroli completed the inscription, adding the following: MONASTERI SANCTI AGOSTINI. Elena Anguissola was a nun in the convent of di Sant'Agostino, in Mantua.

The painting demonstrates the ability and expressive force of the painter, and the preference for an expressive physiognomy, typical of cinquecento painting in Lombardy. The attention to psychological expression illustrated here is also present in may other paintings by Sofonisba Anguissola; in the Chess Game of 1555, and her in Self Portrait at the Spinet, the painter showed female ability in playing chess or a musical instrument as an essential part of a young noble woman's education.

The Portrait of Elena Anguissola  was in the collection of the Earl of Yaborough, remaining there until 1936, when it was acquired by the museum in Southampton. According to Rossana Sacchi it was at one time attributed to Titian. Only later was it recognised as a work of Sofonisba Anguissola and as of a portrait of her sister Elena.

The portrait of the religious woman is done on a dark background. The young nun hold a tiny book in her hands, covered with red leather and trimmed with gold. The style of the painting recalls Correggio, Lorenzo Lotto, and also Bernardino Gatti. Anguissola lingers on certain details and captures the sweetness, and the intensity of the look and the calmness of the nun: it creates a silent and contemplative images, built around the almost solid geometries of the nun's costume.

References

Bibliography 

 
 
 
 
 
 

Paintings in the United Kingdom
Collection of Southampton City Art Gallery
Anguissola, Elena
1551 paintings